The House of Goštautai  (Lithuanian plural form), masculine Goštautas and feminine form Goštautaitė  (In Polish - Gastoldowie, later transformed into Gasztołdowie),  Gochtovtt, were a Lithuanian family, one of the most influential magnate families during the 15th and early 16th centuries. Their only serious rivals were the Kęsgailos, and from the end of the 15th century the fast rising in power and influence Radvila family clan. It appears from the Latin original spelling of their name Gastoldus which is a variation of castaldius that they had been close to the Grand Dukes and that their function was to oversee ducal demesne. Most power family gained during the  reign of Casimir Jagiellon. The castaldius of Vytautas, Andrius Goštautas might have been a voivode of Vilnius and Kreva, and father of Jonas, appears to have been the precursor of the family growth. The majority of the family's possessions (lands) were in the western part of the Duchy and eastern ethnic Lithuania. After the death of the last scion of the family, Stanislovas Goštautas, the Polish King and Grand Duke of Lithuania Sigismund II Augustus inherited his possessions as a matter of right, per Grand Duchy of Lithuania law.

Name

The Goštautai family name may be found in numerous renderings: Gasztold, Gasztołd,  Gasztołt, Gashtold, Gastoldus, Gastold, Gastołd, Gosztold, Gosztowd, Gosztowt, Gosztowtt, Gochtovtt, Gasztowt, Gaszdtowt, Gasztowtt, Gasthawdus, Gostautas and Goštautas; these are all different renderings of the same distorted pagan given name of Goštautai's ancestor, mentioned in written sources as Johann Gastawd. Upon the baptism he retained his pagan Lithuanian name (which may be reconstructed as *Gāstaŭtas) and passed it on to his descendants; that was a common practice of the rising Lithuanian nobility subsequent to the Christianization of Lithuania. Hence at first such names were used much like patronymics rather than surnames in a modern sense. 

In Lithuanian  the name of the clan is rendered Goštautai or Gostautai (singular, Goštautas or Gostautas); in Polish the forms Gastold or  Gasztołd are used. Contemporary written sources use different forms of the name; latest English sources use both forms, Polish Gasztold and Lithuanian  Gostautas.

Notable family members

Jonas Goštautas (1393 or 1408–1458), voivod of Vilnius and Trakai. He led Council of Lords which elected 13-year-old Casimir IV Jagiellon as Grand Duke of Lithuania, and thus for three years abolished the personal union with Poland.
Martynas Goštautas (1428–1472), Voivode of Kiev and Voivode of Trakai
Albertas Goštautas (1462–1539), best known member of the family. He was voivod of Vilnius Voivodeship and chancellor of the Grand Duchy of Lithuania. He was one of the initiators and financiers of Lithuanian Statutes.
Stanislovas Goštautas (1507(?) – 1542) was the last representative of the main family branch
 Jan Gasztowtt (1800–1871), the author of "Pan Sędzic czyli Opowiadanie o Litwie i Żmudzi", participant of the 1831 uprising
 Zigmantas Goštautas (1889–1980), cynologist, recreated Lithuanian Hounds
Séverin, Titus, Alexandre de Gastold (1805-1862),il participe à la campagne contre la Russie en 1830 et 1831 et aux batailles devant Grochów les 20 et 25 février 1831, puis devant Varsovie les 6 et 7 septembre 1831. (Archives Nationales, BB 11 380)
Carmen Bernos de Gasztold (1919-1995), French nun and author

References

Sources
 Козлоўскі С. Гаштовта - уладальнікі Ліпнішок. Нарыс гісторыі аднаго роду / Сяргей Козлоўскі // Ліпнішкі – 500 гадоў гісторыі (1510 – 2010 гг.)»: Рэгіянальная навуковая канферэнцыя прысвечаная 500 – годдзю Ліпнішкаўскай парафіі і 400-годдзю надання мястэчку Магдэбурскага права. / пад рэд. А.К. Гецэвіча – Гродна, 2010р. – С. 14-19

External links
 Genealogia rodziny Gastold
 Site de la famille Gochtovtt
 Armoires des Gosctovtt